Carl Delano Howard, Jr. (born September 20, 1961) is a former American football cornerback in the National Football League for the Dallas Cowboys, Tampa Bay Buccaneers, and New York Jets. He played college football at Rutgers University.

Early years
Howard attended Irvington High School, where he practiced football, baseball and track.

He walked on at Rutgers University in 1980. He became a three-year starter at left cornerback and is mostly remembered for returning a blocked punt against the United States Military Academy for a 12-yard touchdown.

Professional career

Dallas Cowboys
Howard was signed as an undrafted free agent by the Dallas Cowboys after the 1984 NFL Draft. He was used as a backup cornerback and special teams, before being placed on the injured reserve list on November 20. He was waived on September 2, 1985.

Houston Oilers
On September 4, 1985, he was claimed off waivers by the Houston Oilers, before being released on September 7.

Tampa Bay Buccaneers
Howard was signed as a free agent by the Tampa Bay Buccaneers on October 15, 1985. He was mainly used in special teams, until being cut on November 12 to make room for Ricky Easmon.

New York Jets
On December 5, 1985, he signed as a free agent with the New York Jets. After being waived on August 30, 1986, he was later re-signed during the season and played in 10 games (3 starts). In the playoffs against the Cleveland Browns, he was involved in a late hit penalty on quarterback Bernie Kosar, that is cited by many observers as the turning point in the 20–23 overtime loss. Although Mark Gastineau received the penalty officially, Howard also hit the player. He also had a 25-yard pass interference penalty in the game.

In 1987, he started 9 games at right cornerback. He was waived on September 12, 1989, after giving up a 31-yard reception that set up the winning touchdown in the season opener. He was re-signed 7 days later.

Howard  was cut on August 27, 1990, only to be re-signed on September 19. He was released on October 10.

References

1961 births
Living people
Irvington High School (New Jersey) alumni
Players of American football from Newark, New Jersey
American football cornerbacks
Rutgers Scarlet Knights football players
Dallas Cowboys players
Tampa Bay Buccaneers players
New York Jets players